Culebra Peak (Spanish for "snake")  is the highest summit of the Culebra Range of the Sangre de Cristo Mountains of the Rocky Mountains of North America. Culebra Peak is the southernmost fourteener in the range.

Geography
Access is limited, and a fee ($150 per person as of Summer 2020) is charged to climb the peak. Ownership of and access to the land, both for recreational and other activities, have been controversial issues for many years, involving multiple lawsuits and occasional violence. In 2017 the ranch the peak was offered for sale for $105 million, and sold later that year for an undisclosed amount. 

Culebra is the fourth-most topographically prominent peak in the state, due to its separation from other peaks by the relatively low La Veta Pass.

According to the current owners of Cielo Vista Ranch, within which the peak is located, Culebra Peak is the highest privately-owned peak in the world.

See also

List of mountain peaks of North America
List of mountain peaks of the United States
List of mountain peaks of Colorado
List of Colorado fourteeners

References

External links

 
Photo Journal from a hike up Culebra Peak

Mountains of Colorado
Mountains of Costilla County, Colorado
Sangre de Cristo Mountains
Fourteeners of Colorado
North American 4000 m summits